The 2013 Indian film Vishwaroopam was subjected to several controversial issues. The first of this kind was the title naming issue, where the Hindu Makkal Katchi party demanded the change from its current Sanskrit title to a purely Tamil one. When Kamal Haasan announced a direct-to-home (DTH) premiere of the film, theatre owners demanded a rollback of this plan, as they feared major revenue losses to DTH companies. Threatened by a complete theatre boycott of Vishwaroopam, Haasan agreed to release the film first in theatres. Later, Muslim groups in Tamil Nadu demanded the ban of the film and claimed, that the film would hurt Muslim sentiments. Although the film was cleared by Central Board of Film Certification of India, district collectors in the state of Tamil Nadu gave orders to the theatre owners to not show Vishwaroopam, citing law and order problems, however the film released in other states with greater Muslim populations than in Tamil Nadu. The ban in Tamil Nadu triggered the stop of screenings in neighbouring Indian states as well as a few foreign markets.

The film fraternity of India condemned the actions instructed by Chief Minister of Tamil Nadu Jayalalitha as a critical attack on freedom of speech in India, but she denied all allegations against her regarding political and business interests. After persistent pressure to cut the film by allegedly objectionable scenes, Kamal Haasan said, he could be forced to leave the state of Tamil Nadu and India, because he was "fed up at being played around in a dirty political game". He estimated the loss of revenues, due to banning policies, somewhere between 300–600 million. A mutual agreement with the Muslims of Tamil Nadu was finally settled on 2 February 2013, when Haasan accepted to mute five scenes.

Title naming 
In June 2012, the film ran into trouble with the Hindu Makkal Katchi who demanded that the title be changed. They claimed that Vishwaroopam was a Sanskrit word rather than a Tamil word, and argued that Kamal Haasan was being against his native language – Tamil – by naming the film in another language, citing "Kamal Haasan, who has been in the industry for more than half a century must be an example for young film makers to take up Tamil titles for their films." The same political party had earlier protested against the song "Kannodu Kannai Kalandhal" in Haasan's Manmadhan Ambu (2010), following which it was removed from the film.

Direct-to-home release 
Vishwaroopam was about to see its premiere on direct-broadcast satellite, or direct-to-home (DTH), platforms, wherein Haasan had roped in many DTH operators for the simultaneous release on DTH along with the theatrical release. However, it was later reported that the concept would be dropped after the Tamil Nadu theatre organisations protested against such a television release. Reports again emerged that Hasaan is keen on releasing Vishwaroopam on DTH platform, stating "If only three percent of population in Tamil Nadu use DTH services, then how much loss can one show of my film possibly cause the producers or theatre owners?". He also added that it would be one time show, few hours before the film actually releases in theatres and would approximately cost . Talks with theatre owners ended in a compromise, where the DTH version would be released one week after the theatrical release in Tamil and Telugu and one day after its release in Hindi in North India, on 2 February. However, Haasan filed a complaint at the Competition Commission of India against the Tamil Nadu theatre owners association for "anti-competitive practices" in restricting the release of Vishwaroopam. The CCI ordered a probe by its investigation arm Director General as there exists a comparable prima facie case.

Depiction of Muslims

Protests and banning
Islamic organizations had earlier demanded that the film be screened to them prior to its release, expressing concern over the depiction of the community in the film. Haasan had organized a special screening of the film for them following their demand. The screening of the film had been put on hold for 15 days by the government of Tamil Nadu under Section 144 of the Indian Criminal Procedure Code, due to persistent allegations made by Islamic organisations including the Tamil Nadu Muslim Munnetra Kazagham (TMMK), while negotiations are still in progress. TMMK leader M. H. Jawahirullah claimed, "There is a danger that the public may view any Muslim with a beard as a terrorist waiting for an opportunity to plant a bomb". Kamal Haasan released a protest note, criticising them for using an "icon bashing" tactic in order to politically profile themselves. Contrary to Jawahirullah, he also stated, that the movie would be giving Muslims a sense of pride.

Haasan took the matter to the Madras High Court, seeking an immediate rollback of the government ban on the basis of approval by the Central Board of Film Certification, however justice K. Venkatraman stayed the screening of Vishwaroopam until 28 January, delaying the release in Tamil Nadu for three days, to review the film. The Madras High Court uphold the ban in Tamil Nadu on 30 January 2013. As a reason was suggested, that the judge was awaiting the result of Haasan's other case against District collectors, who gave orders to ban the film's release. The Andhra Pradesh government stopped the screening in Hyderabad and other areas, where the Milad-un-Nabi festival is celebrated by Muslims, while a precautious stop of screenings was enacted by the distributor in Bangalore in light of Tamil Nadu's ban. Kerala saw an unlimited release of the film, although some Muslim outfits were reportedly arrested by the police of Kerala for disrupting screenings. In Thiruvananthapuram, a group of Social Democratic Party of India (SDPI) supporters took out a protest demonstration to the theatre complex.

The film was later confirmed to release on 26 January in Hyderabad and on 27 January in 25 theatres across Karnataka including 15 in Bangalore. Despite protests Vishwaroopam was screened in Karnataka on 26 January 2013 itself. Screening of the film was disrupted in some parts of Mysore, Bangalore, and Shimoga districts following protests. However, Vishwaroopam was taken off theatres across Karnataka following police advisory. Meanwhile, theatres in Malaysia and Sri Lanka removed the film, citing the ban in Tamil Nadu. The film was released in Uttar Pradesh, where leaders initially reserved a possible ban for the film, without any major incidences.

Haasan said that he would file a petition in the Supreme Court to overturn the ban. Haasan expressed grief during a press conference he held at his residence, which he had pawned as part of securing the budget for Vishwaroopam. At the widely broadcast press conference, he referenced filmmaker M. F. Husain when he stated his intent of emigrating from Tamil Nadu for another secular state or country. Kamal Haasan said, "I mean no harm. The film is not about hurting Muslims. The good Muslims in the films are Indians and bad Muslims are terrorists who are not from India. How can I paint terrorist...terrorism white." For further talks, the Muslim party demanded a cut of around nine minutes of the film. Chief Minister Jayalalithaa defended the government's action, stating it was not in a position to provide security across all 524 theatres where it was to be screened from 25 January. A mutual agreement was finally settled on 2 February 2013, when Haasan agreed to mute five scenes. The Malaysian government will hold a meeting with distributor of Vishwaroopam to find a solution to lift the ban on it. The National Censorship Board and the Malaysian Islamic Development Department reviewed the film and the Home ministry lifted the ban on 19 February 2013.

Reactions from Indian filmmakers 
These developments have been widely criticised by several filmmakers and politicians alike. Backing Kamal Haasan, Rajinikanth stated,
 Leela Samson, chairperson of the Central Board of Film Certification, condemned the allegations of the film being anti-Islamic stating that: 

Shah Rukh Khan, who also faced obstructions during the release of Billu Barber (2009) and My Name is Khan (2010) and whose Red Chillies VFX was responsible for Vishwaroopam'''s visual effects, expressed sympathies for Haasan's situation, stating that a ban is "the most unfortunate thing to happen to a film". The banning of Vishwaroopam was deemed "unfair" by Prakash Raj, who stated that "cultural terrorism should stop". The film's ban was decried by Ajith Kumar who questioned whether India was "a secular nation or being played on the basis of vote bank politics". Fellow filmmaker Bharathiraja compared Haasan along the likes of Bharathiyar for his bold statements on social issues in his films. Demonstrating solidarity, Vijay and the crew of Thalaivaa halted filming until the release of Vishwaroopam in Tamil Nadu. Actor-director R. Parthiban stated that "people are the best judges and that they should decide on whether the film is against a community or not". Filmmaker Mahesh Bhatt stated that humiliation of an "immaculate actor" and "national treasure" is "one of the darkest moments for the entire film fraternity".

Other individuals who expressed their disapproval of the film's ban include Sushilkumar Shinde, Aamir Khan, Anubhav Sinha, Manoj Bajpayee, Siddharth, R. Madhavan, Dhanush, A. R. Murugadoss, Linguswamy, Ameer Sultan, Muktha Srinivasan, Salman Rushdie, Deepa Mehta, Salman Khan, Abhishek Bachchan, Chitrangda Singh, Amitabh Bachchan, Farhan Akhtar, Akshay Kumar, Mahesh Babu, Pawan Kalyan, Anupam Kher, Karan Johar, A. Samad Said, Madhur Bhandarkar, Shabana Azmi, Shyam Benegal and Ketan Mehta. Film critic Baradwaj Rangan mentioned "This film glorifies Islam, portraying the Muslim as an upstanding specimen who won’t think twice before punishing a wrongdoer from his own faith."

 Political response 
Dravida Munnetra Kazhagam president M. Karunanidhi alleged that the  inactivity of the J. Jayalalitha administration on the film is the result of a wrath over Kamal Haasan who had recently expressed his opinion "on wanting to see a dhoti-clad Tamilian" for prime minister at a function in Chennai. The comment was made at a function attended by Finance Minister P. Chidambaram and Karunanidhi. Karunanidhi accused Jayalalithaa for being involved in a conflict-of-interest; Jaya TV, a television network closely associated with the All India Anna Dravida Munnetra Kazhagam, had previously placed a bid on the satellite distribution rights for Vishwaroopam, which Haasan declined citing a low offer.

Jayalalitha justified the ban to maintain law and order based on intelligence reports and said that there was no political motive behind the move. She also offered support from government to facilitate talks to see the release of the film and said she will sue Karunanidhi and media for maligning her on the issue.

 Other issues 
Tamil Nadu Brahmin Association (TAMBRAS) filed a complaint with City police commissioner that film contained scenes that offended the community and requested to remove the same. A petition asking for a nationwide ban on screening the film citing some of scenes offending the Christian community was dismissed by the Madras High Court. Director Ameer stated that Vishwaroopam portrayed Talibans as "cruel and inhumane", while according to him they were actually "helpless citizens fighting for the right of their own country", an issue which was not debated about. He compared the Talibans to the Liberation Tigers of Tamil Eelam, saying "Just like how Prabhakaran and his associates fought for their Eelam rights, the Taliban fight for their country. And similar to how it is injustice to the Eelam if we were to portray them as raw terrorists, it is equally absurd of Vishwaroopam'' to have portrayed Taliban as mad destroyers".

References 

Political controversies in India
2012 controversies
2013 controversies
2013 in India
Film controversies in India
Religious controversies in India